Oscar Einar Steen (born 20 July 1982) is a professional Swedish ice hockey forward currently playing for AIK in the Elitserien. He has played several seasons in the Swedish Elitserien, the first playing for Färjestads BK and then for Leksands IF and MoDo. In 2007 Steen won the Swedish Championships with MoDo. In the summer of 2010, MoDo opted not to renew Steen's contract, so he signed for AIK. Steen won the Rookie of the Year award in the 2004–05 Elitserien season. Steen is the younger brother to Calle Steen.

Career statistics

Regular season and playoffs

References

External links

1982 births
Living people
AIK IF players
Färjestad BK players
Bofors IK players
Leksands IF players
Modo Hockey players
Swedish ice hockey centres
Ice hockey people from Stockholm